The Standard Television Interface Chip or STIC is a video encoder chip produced by General Instrument as AY-3-8900/AY-3-8900-1 and used on the Mattel Intellivision.

The chip provides all the display functions on the machine, and works as an internal timer. Resolution is 167 x 105 pixels in NTSC and 168 x 104 pixels in PAL, over which movable objects (MOBs) can be placed. These are restricted to a visible area of 159 x 96 pixels.
Other objects, such as a 20 x 12 matrix of 8x8 background cards can be used to create scenery or provide game information.
The STIC also computes collision information between the objects and screen borders.
There are multiple display modes depending on how objects are handles, such as Color Stack, Colored Squares and Foreground/Background mode.

Characteristics

operates at 4 MHz or 3.579545 MHz (NTSC)
14-bit multiplexed data/address bus shared with CPU 
20x12 tiled playfield, tiles are 8x8 pixels for a resolution of 159x96 (right pixel not displayed)
16 color palette, two colors per tile
Foreground/Background mode; all 16 colors available for background and colors 1–8 available for foreground per tile; grom cards limited to the first 64
Color Stack mode; all 16 colors available for foreground per tile; background colour from a four colour rotating stack of any four colors, all 277 grom and gram cards available
Colored Squares mode allows each tile to have four different colored 4x4 blocks as in Snafu); first seven colors available for foreground blocks; background colour from the color stack
8 sprites (all visible on the same scanline). Hardware supports the following features per-sprite:
coordinate addressable off screen for smooth edge entries and exits
Size selection: 8x16 or 8 pixels wide by 8 half-pixels high
Stretching: horizontal (1× or 2×) and vertical (1×, 2×, 4× or 8×)
Mirroring: horizontal and vertical
Collision detection: sprite to sprite, sprite to background, and sprite to screen border
Priority: selects whether sprite appears in front of or behind background.
 fine horizontal and vertical pixel scrolling
 all STIC attributes and GRAM re-programmable at VBLANK, 60 times a second

Color Palette
A 16 color palette is available, divided into two sets.

Primary Color Set                              

Pastel Color Set        

Note: The displayed colors are approximate. Actual tones varied according to the analog television standard and quality of the CRT display.

See also
 Thomson EF9345
 Motorola 6845
 TMS9918
 MOS Technology VIC-II

References

External links
 Datasheet
 PAL version discussion
 Color palette discussion

Graphics chips
Texas Instruments hardware
Intellivision